No More in Life is the second album by jazz vocalist Mildred Anderson recorded in 1960 and released on the Bluesville label early the following year.

Reception

AllMusic reviewer Scott Yanow stated: "Considering how well she sings on this set, it is strange that Mildred Anderson would have no further opportunities to lead her own albums". Chris Smith, in The Penguin Guide to Blues Recordings described the album as "uneven", on the title track "her pitch and dynamics are erratic". Of one of the stronger tracks: "Oddly, given that Anderson can have problems even with harmonically straightforward material, "That Old Devil Called Love", an audacious attempt at Billie Holiday's style is quite appealing." Smith says the album is "not as inessential as Person to Person, her earlier Bluesville album.

Track listing 
All compositions by Mildred Anderson except where noted
 "Everybody's Got Somebody But Me" – 5:33
 "I Ain't Mad at You" (Count Basie, Milton Ebbins, Freddie Green) – 3:02
 "Hard Times" (Esmond Edwards) – 4:12
 "No More in Life" – 2:42
 "Roll 'Em Pete" (Pete Johnson, Big Joe Turner) – 3:16
 "What More Can a Woman Do" (Dave Barbour, Peggy Lee) – 2:41
 "That Ole Devil Called Love" (Allan Roberts, Doris Fisher) – 3:45
 "Mistreater" – 6:01
 "I'm Lost" (Otis René) – 4:36

Personnel 
 Mildred Anderson – vocals
 Al Sears – tenor saxophone
 Robert Banks – organ
 Lord Westbrook – guitar
 Leonard Gaskin – bass
 Bobby Donaldson – drums

References 

Mildred Anderson albums
1961 albums
Albums produced by Ozzie Cadena
Albums recorded at Van Gelder Studio
Bluesville Records albums